Pyrsonympha is a genus of Excavata.

It includes the species Pyrsonympha vertens.

References

Metamonads
Excavata genera